Wriothesley Russell, 2nd Duke of Bedford KG (1 November 1680 – 26 May 1711) was an English nobleman and politician. He was the son of William Russell, Lord Russell, and his wife Lady Rachel Wriothesley. From 1683 until 1694, he was styled Lord Russell, and from 1695 until his accession in 1700, Marquess of Tavistock.

Russell married the rich heiress Elizabeth Howland, daughter of John Howland of Streatham, on 23 May 1695. Shortly thereafter (13 June 1695), his grandfather, the Duke of Bedford, was created Baron Howland of Streatham to commemorate the marriage. The couple had six children:
William Russell, Marquess of Tavistock (13 August 1703 – December 1703)
William Russell, Marquess of Tavistock (1704 – c. May 1707)
Lady Rachael Russell (c. 1707–1777), married Scroop Egerton, 1st Duke of Bridgwater, as her first husband, and had issue.  She was widowed on 11 January 1744.  On 14 December 1745, at St James, Westminster, she married her second husband, Lt-General Sir Richard Lyttelton, KB.
Wriothesley Russell, 3rd Duke of Bedford (1708–1732)
Lt.-Gen. Sir John Russell, 4th Duke of Bedford (1710–1771)
Lady Elizabeth Russell (1704–1784), married William Capell, 3rd Earl of Essex, and had issue.

On 13 May 1696, Tavistock, as he then was, matriculated at Magdalen College, Oxford. Around 1698, he began the construction of the Howland Great Wet Dock on the Thames, on some of his wife's dowry lands in Rotherhithe.

Russell held the offices of Lord Lieutenant of Cambridgeshire, Bedfordshire and Middlesex between 1701 and 1711. He was also a Gentleman of the Bedchamber to William III from 1701 to 1702. After William's death, he was invested as a Knight of the Garter on 14 March 1702 and served as Lord High Constable of England for the coronation of Queen Anne.

Russell died in 1711, aged 30, from smallpox and was buried on 30 May 1711 in the 'Bedford Chapel' at St. Michael's Church at Chenies, Buckinghamshire.

References

External links
 

|-

|-

|-

|-

1680 births
1711 deaths
Alumni of Magdalen College, Oxford
Deaths from smallpox
402
Wriothesley
Garter Knights appointed by Anne
Lord-Lieutenants of Bedfordshire
Lord-Lieutenants of Cambridgeshire
Lord-Lieutenants of Middlesex
Wriothesley
Infectious disease deaths in England